Rheum australe, synonym Rheum emodi, is a flowering plant in the family  Polygonaceae. It is commonly known as Himalayan rhubarb, Indian rhubarb and Red-veined pie plant. It is a medicinal herb used in the Indian Unani system of medicine, and formerly in the European system of medicine where it was traded as Indian rhubarb. The plant is found in the sub-alpine and alpine Himalayas at an altitude of 4000 m.

Description
The plant has a 1.5-2m high stem. Its stem is stout, red, and streaked green and brown. The large leaves are heart-shaped or roundish with a heart-shaped base, and greenish-red in colour. The basal leaves can be up to 60 cm wide.

It has dark reddish-purple or yellow flowers in late spring to summer, in densely-branched clusters, in a inflorescence up to 30 cm long. The inflorescence enlarges greatly when in fruit.

Similar species
According to the 2003 key in the Flora of China, this species is distinguished from other entire-leaved rhubarbs in China with leaves having a wavy or crisped margin; R. wittrockii, R. rhabarbarum, R. webbianum and R. hotaoense, by having less than 1 cm-sized fruit, purple-red flowers, and the surface of the rachis of panicle being densely pubescent. It is the only rhubarb in this group to have purple-red flowers as opposed to various shades of white.

Karyotypy
A 1947 study found plants of R. emodi a chromosome count of 2n=22, but the same study found plants labelled as R. australe to be 2n=44. It is possible that this karyotypic diversity indicates the existence of one or more cryptic species, because the polyploid forms would essentially be reproductively isolated.

Distribution
Native to India, Myanmar, Nepal, Pakistan, Bhutan, and Sikkim.

Ecology
It grows on grassy or rocky slopes, crevices and moraines, forest margins, near streams and between boulders in specific zones. Impatiens glandulifera in the Valley of Flowers, Uttarakhand, India.

Cultivation
It is said to be quite hardy and readily propagated.

Chemical constituents 
Hydroxyanthracene derivatives are mainly emodin, chrysophanol and their glycosides. Other hydroxyanthracene derivatives are rhein, aloe emodin and physcion and their glycosides.

References 

australe
Plant dyes